Gemeiner (pl. Gemeine, en: private or soldier) was until 1918 the common designation to soldier(s) in the Austro-Hungarian Army (k.u.k. Army) and German Army. In line to the particular branch of service it contained the rank file as follows:
Dragoner (en: dragoon),
Grenadier,
Husar (hussar),
Infanterist (infantryman)
Jäger (rifleman), 
Füsilier (fusilier | Am. also fusileer),
Kanonier (gunner, cannoneer),
Musketier (musketeer), etc.
Pionier (engineer)
Sanitätssoldat (medicalman)
Trainsoldat (trainman)
Ulan (uhlan)

Gallery, "k.u.k. Inf.Rgt. Hoch- und Deutschmeister Nr. 4" (l.t.r)

See also 
 Rank insignia of the Austro-Hungarian armed forces

Sources 
 BROCKHAUS, The encyclopaedia in 24 volumes (1796–2001), Volume 8: 3-7653-3668-8, page 290; definition: «Gemeiner»

References 

Military of Austria
Military ranks of Austria
Military ranks of Germany